Eric Richard Little (28 May 1910 – 10 April 1999) was an Australian rules footballer who played with Carlton and St Kilda in the Victorian Football League (VFL).

Notes

External links 

Eric Little's profile at Blueseum

1910 births
1999 deaths
Carlton Football Club players
St Kilda Football Club players
Australian rules footballers from Victoria (Australia)
Coburg Football Club players